Carl Robert Jakobson ( – ) was an Estonian writer, politician and teacher active in the Governorate of Livonia, Russian Empire. He was one of the most important persons of the Estonian national awakening in the second half of the 19th century.

Political activity
Between 1860 and 1880, the Governorate of Livonia was led by a moderate nobility-dominated government. Jakobson became the leader of the radical wing, advocating widespread reforms in Livonia. He was responsible for the economic-political program of the Estonian national movement. Jakobson urged Estonians to demand equal political rights with the region's Germans and an end to privileged position of the Baltic-German nobility.

In 1878, Jakobson established the Estonian newspaper Sakala. The paper quickly became a vital promoter of the cultural awakening. He also had a central role in the establishment of the Society of Estonian Literati, which was an influential Estonian association in the second half of the 19th century.

Jakobson died on March 19, 1882 at the age of 40 in the village of Kurgja, where he lived in the Kurgja Manor.

Legacy

Museum

In 1948, the Museum of Carl Robert Jakobson was established by Jakobson's oldest daughter, Linda, in their family estate in Kurgja. The main house of the museum includes an exhibition which introduces the life and activities Jakobson. The museum is designed to illustrate elements of rural life in Estonia during Jakobson's lifetime and remains an active farm with cattle-breeding and land cultivation.

500 kroon note

Carl Robert Jakobson was depicted on the 500 kroon banknote.

References

External links
 Estonian banknotes – 500 kroons
 Ingrid Rüütel's 6 July 2003 speech

1841 births
1882 deaths
Writers from Tartu
Politicians from Tartu
People from Kreis Dorpat
Estonian politicians
Estonian journalists
19th-century Estonian writers
19th-century journalists
Male journalists
Estonian male writers
19th-century male writers
19th-century Estonian educators